Haycock is a surname. Notable people with the surname include:

 Alexander Haycock (1882–1970), British politician
 D. Arthur Haycock (1916–1994), American secretary with the LDS Church
 David Boyd Haycock (born 1968), British writer
 Fred Haycock (1886–1955), English footballer
 Joseph Longford Haycock (1850–1937), Canadian farmer and politician
 Myfanwy Haycock (1913–1963), Welsh poet
 Obed Crosby Haycock (1901–1983), American scientist
 Pete Haycock (1951-2013), English musician